Neopleurotomoides aembe is a species of sea snail, a marine gastropod mollusk in the family Raphitomidae.

Description

Distribution
This marine species occurs in the Campos Basin, southeast Brazil, at a depth of more than 1900 m.

References

 Figueira R.M. Andrade & Absalão R.S. (2012) Deep-water Raphitomidae (Mollusca, Gastropoda, Conoidea) from the Campos Basin, southeast Brazil. Zootaxa 3527: 1–27.

External links
 Oliveira, Cleo Dilnei De Castro, et al. "Critical review of type specimens deposited in the Malacological collection of the biological institute/Ufrj, Rio de Janeiro, Brazil." Zootaxa 4415.1 (2018): 91-117

aembe
Gastropods described in 2012